Republic of Marshall Islands Public School System (PSS) is the public school system of the Marshall Islands, headquartered in Majuro. It was established in November 2013 by Public Law 2013-23.

It is a part of the Ministry of Education, Sports and Training.

Schools

Elementary schools 
The system's Division of Instruction and School Management, headed by an Associate Commissioner, is responsible for the operation of its elementary schools:
 Ailinglaplap
 Airok Ailinglaplap
 Buoj Elementary School
 Enewa Elementary School
 Jah Elementary School
 Jeh Elementary School
 Jobwon Elementary School
 Katiej Elementary School
 Mejel Elementary School
 Woja Elementary School
 Ailuk
 Ailuk Elementary School
 Enejelar Elementary School
 Arno
 Arno Elementary School
 Bikarej Elementary School
 Ine Elementary School
 Jabo Elementary School
 Kilange Elementary School
 Longar Elementary School
 Lukoj Elementary School
 Matolen Elementary School
 Tinak Elementary School
 Tutu Elementary School
 Ulien Elementary School
 Aur Atoll
 Aur Elementary School
 Tobal Elementary School
 Ebon Atoll
 Ebon Elementary School
 Enekoion Elementary School
 Toka Elementary School
 Enewetak
 Enewetak Elementary School
 Jabat
 Jabat Elementary School
 Jaluit
 Imiej Elementary School
 Imroj Elementary School
 Jabnoden Elementary School
 Jabor Elementary School
 Jaluit Elementary School
 Mejrirok Elementary School
 Narmej Elementary School
 Kili Island
 Kili Elementary School
 Kwajalein
 Carlos Elementary School
 Ebadon Elementary School
 Ebeye Public Elementary School
 Ebeye Public Middle School
 Eniburr Elementary School
 Mejatto Elementary School on Mejatto serves Ronglap people
 Lae Atoll
 Lae Elementary School
 Lib Island
 Lib Elementary School
 Likiep
 Jebal Elementary School
 Likieb Elementary School
 Melang Elementary School
 Majuro
 Ajeltake Elementary School
 Delap Elementary School - In 2016 the Western Association of Schools and Colleges (WASC) re-accredited the school until 2022.
 Ejit Elementary School
 Laura Elementary School
 Long Island Elementary School
 Majuro Middle School
 Rairok Elementary School
 Rita Elementary School - WASC accredited Rita Elementary in 2018.
 North Delap Elementary School
 Woja Maj. Elementary School
 Maloelap
 Aerok Elementary School
 Jang Elementary School
 Kaben Elementary School
 Ollet Elementary School
 Tarawa Elementary School
 Mejit Island
 Mejit Elementary School
 Mili Atoll
 Enejet Elementary School
 Lukonwod Elementary School
 Mili Elementary School
 Nallo Elementary School
 Tokewa Elementary School
 Namdrik Atoll
 Namdrik Elementary School
 Namu Atoll
 Loen Elementary School
 Mae Elementary School
 Majkin Elementary School
 Namo Elementary School
 Ujae
 Ujae Elementary School
 Utrik
 Utrik Elementary School
 Wotho
 Wotho Elementary School
 Wotje←
 Wodmej Elementary School
 Wotje Elementary School

Secondary schools 
The Office of Secondary and Career Education is responsible for serving students that have completed their primary education and reached the age of 14, enrolling them in one of the following six secondary schools it operates:
 Jaluit High School (JHS) - Jaluit Atoll
 Kwajalein Atoll High School (KAHS) - Kwajalein Atoll
 Eniburr High School (EHS) - Kwajalein Atoll
 Laura High School (LHS) - Majuro Atoll - WASC accredited Laura High in 2018.
 Marshall Islands High School (MIHS) - Majuro Atoll
 Northern Islands High School (NIHS) - Wotje Atoll
 Life Skills Academy - Majuro

See also 
 Ministry of Education (Marshall Islands)

References

External links
 

Education in the Marshall Islands